Given an atomic DEVS model, simulation algorithms are methods to generate the model's legal behaviors which are trajectories not to reach to illegal states. (see Behavior of DEVS). [Zeigler84] originally introduced the algorithms that handle time variables related to lifespan  and elapsed time  by introducing two other time variables, last event time, and next event time  with the following relations:

and

where  denotes the current time. And the remaining time,

  is equivalently computed as
, apparently .

Since the behavior of a given atomic DEVS model can be defined in two different views depending on the total state and the external transition function (refer to Behavior of DEVS), the simulation algorithms are also introduced in two different views as below.

Common parts 
Regardless of two different views of total states, algorithms for initialization and internal transition cases are commonly defined as below.

 DEVS-simulator
   variables:
     parent // parent coordinator
          // time of last event
          // time of next event
     // the associated Atomic DEVS model 
   when receive init-message(Time )
      
      
   when receive star-message(Time )
      if  then
         error: bad synchronization;
      
      send y-message() to parent;

View 1: total states = states * elapsed times 
As addressed in Behavior of Atomic DEVS, when DEVS receives an input event, right calling , the last event time, is set by the current time,, thus the elapsed time becomes zero because .

   when receive x-message(Time )
      if  and  == false then
         error: bad synchronization;

View 2: total states = states * lifespans * elapsed times 

   when receive x-message(Time )
      if  and  == false then
         error: bad synchronization;
      
      if  then

See also 
 Atomic DEVS
 Behavior of atomic DEVS
 Simulation algorithms for coupled DEVS

References 
 [Zeigler84] 
 [ZKP00] 

Algorithms